The 2016–17 Georgia Lady Bulldogs women's basketball team represented the University of Georgia in the 2016–17 NCAA Division I women's basketball season. The Lady Bulldogs, led by second year head coach Joni Taylor, played their home games at Stegeman Coliseum, and were members of the Southeastern Conference. They finished the season 16–15, 7–9 in SEC play to finish in a tie for eighth place. They advanced to the quarterfinals of the SEC women's tournament where they lost to South Carolina.

Roster

Schedule

|-
! colspan="12" style=""| Non-conference regular season

|-
! colspan="12" style=""| SEC regular season

|-
!colspan="12" style=""| SEC Women's Tournament

Rankings
2016–17 NCAA Division I women's basketball rankings

See also
 2016–17 Georgia Bulldogs basketball team

References

Georgia Lady Bulldogs basketball seasons
Georgia
Bulldogs
Bulldogs